The following outline is provided as an overview of and topical guide to clinical research:

Clinical research is the aspect of biomedical research that addresses the assessment of new pharmaceutical and biological drugs, medical devices and vaccines in humans.

General topics
 Clinical significance – a conclusion that an intervention has an effect that is of practical meaning to patients
 Drug discovery – the identification of candidates, synthesis, characterization, screening, and assays for therapeutic efficacy
 Drug development – the process of taking a new chemical through the stages necessary to allow testing in clinical trials
 Biotechnology – the technological application that uses biological systems, living organisms to make or modify products or processes for specific use
 Biopharmaceutical – a drug produced using biotechnology
 Clinical trial – an experiment with human subjects to assess safety and efficacy of drugs
 Academic clinical trials – clinical trials run at academic centers (e.g., medical schools, academic hospitals, and universities)
 Clinical trials unit – biomedical research units dedicated to conducting clinical trials
 Epidemiology – the study of factors affecting the health and illness of populations
 Epidemiological methods – statistical techniques used in epidemiology
 Evidence-based medicine – the assessment of the quality of evidence relevant to the risks and benefits of medical treatments
 Pharmacology – the study of the interactions that occur between a living organism and drugs that alter normal biochemical function
 Biopharmacology – the pharmacology of biopharmaceuticals
 Clinical pharmacology – the scientific discipline focused on rational drug development and utilization in therapeutics
 Pharmacokinetics – the study of the fate of drugs administered to the body
 Bioequivalence – the biological equivalence of two preparations of a drug
 Pharmacodynamics – the study of the biochemical and physiological effects of drugs on the body
 Pharmacometrics – the science of interpreting and describing pharmacology in a quantitative fashion
 Pharmacovigilance – the detection, assessment, understanding and prevention of adverse effects of medicines

Drug terminology
 Active ingredient – the substance in a drug that is pharmaceutically active
 Approved drug – a drug that has been approved for marketing by a regulatory body such as the U.S. Food and Drug Administration or the European Medicines Agency
 Excipient – an inactive substance used as a carrier for the active ingredients of a drug
 Medicinal product – any substance or combination of substances used for treating or preventing disease in humans
 Off-label use – the practice of prescribing a drug for an indication for which the drug has not been approved
 Orphan drug – a drug used to treat a rare medical condition, or orphan disease
 Placebo – a sham treatment given to a control group in a clinical study
 Prescription drug – a licensed medicine that can only be obtained by prescription from a doctor
 Standard treatment – a currently available drug used in an active control clinical study

Types of study design

Clinical study design
 Blind experiment
 Case report
 Case series
 Case study
 Case-control study
 Clinical control group
 Cohort study
 Cross-sectional study
 Crossover study
 First-in-man study
 Longitudinal study
 Minimisation
 Multicenter trial
 Nested case-control study
 Observational study
 Open-label trial
 Placebo-controlled studies
 Prospective cohort study
 Randomized controlled trial
 Retrospective cohort study
 Run-in period
 Seeding trial
 Vaccine trial

Study participant confidentiality and safety

Human subject research
 Adverse drug reaction
 Adverse event
 Council for International Organizations of Medical Sciences
 Data confidentiality in clinical trials
 Data monitoring committees
 Ethics Committee (European Union)
 EudraVigilance
 Exclusion criteria
 Great ape research ban
 Inclusion criteria
 Institutional review board
 MedWatch
 Safety monitoring
 Serious adverse event
 Suspected Adverse Reaction Surveillance Scheme

Clinical study management
 Clinical monitoring
 Clinical Trial Management System
 Good clinical practice

Clinical research documents
 Clinical trial protocol
 Informed consent
 Investigator's brochure
 Source document
 Standing operating procedure

Clinical research personnel
 Clinical investigator
 Clinical research associate
 Clinical research coordinator

Contract research organizations

Contract research organization
 PPD
 Covance
 Parexel
 Quintiles
 Westat

Data collection and management

Clinical data acquisition
 Case report form
 Clinical data management system
 Clinical data repository
 Data clarification form
 Electronic data capture
 Good clinical data management practice
 Patient diary
 Patient-reported outcome
 Remote data entry

Medical term coding dictionaries

Medical classification
 Uppsala Monitoring Centre
 COSTART
 MedDRA
 Systematized Nomenclature of Medicine (SNOMED)
 WHOART
 Common Terminology Criteria for Adverse Events

Clinical Data Interchange Standards Consortium

Clinical Data Interchange Standards Consortium
 Study Data Tabulation Model (SDTM)
 Standard for Exchange of Non-clinical Data (SEND)
 JANUS clinical trial data repository

Data analysis

Analysis of clinical trials
 Censoring (clinical trials)
 Effect size
 End point of clinical trials
 Hazard ratio
 Meta-analysis
 Number needed to harm
 Number needed to treat
 Odds ratio
 Intention to treat analysis
 Post-hoc analysis
 Relative risk
 Risk–benefit analysis
 Sensitivity and specificity
 Subgroup analysis
 Substantial equivalence
 Surrogate endpoint
 Systematic review
 Therapeutic effect

Results reporting
 Medical writing
 Clinical trials publication
 Common Technical Document
 Consolidated Standards of Reporting Trials (CONSORT)
 Electronic Common Technical Document
 Preferred Reporting Items for Systematic Reviews and Meta-Analyses (PRISMA)
 Strengthening the reporting of observational studies in epidemiology (STROBE)
 Uniform Requirements for Manuscripts Submitted to Biomedical Journals (URM)

Notable clinical studies
 British Doctors Study – in 1956 provided convincing statistical proof that tobacco smoking increased the risk of lung cancer.
 Framingham Heart Study – a cardiovascular study based in Framingham, Massachusetts, which began in 1948 with 5,209, and is now on its third generation of participants.
 Heart Protection Study – the largest study to investigate the use of statins in the prevention of cardiovascular disease.
 International Studies of Infarct Survival – four randomized controlled trials of several drugs for treating suspected acute myocardial infarction.
 Intersalt study – a landmark observational study that showed a strong association between dietary salt and risk of cardiovascular disease.
 JUPITER trial – the first clinical trial to demonstrate that statin therapy may provide benefit to patients with low-to-normal LDL levels and no known cardiovascular disease.
 Multicenter AIDS Cohort Study – a study of over 6,000 men infected with HIV that has been ongoing for over 25 years
 Stateville Penitentiary Malaria Study – a controlled study of the effects of malaria on the inmates of Stateville Penitentiary near Joliet, Illinois.
 Tuskegee Study of Untreated Syphilis in the Negro Male – a clinical study, conducted between 1932 and 1972 in Tuskegee, Alabama studied the natural progression of the disease if left untreated.

Legislation, regulations and guidances

European Union
 Directive 2001/20/EC
 Directive 2001/83/EC
 Directive 2005/28/EC
 Directive 65/65/EEC
 Directive 93/41/EEC
 Directive 95/46/EC on the protection of personal data

United States
 Federal Food, Drug, and Cosmetic Act (FD&C) – gives authority to the Food and Drug Administration (FDA) to oversee the safety of food, drugs, and cosmetics.
 Kefauver Harris Amendment – requires drug manufacturers to provide proof of the effectiveness and safety of drugs before approval.
 Prescription Drug User Fee Act – allows the Food and Drug Administration (FDA) to collect fees from drug manufacturers to fund the new drug approval process.
 Title 21 of the Code of Federal Regulations – the section of Federal regulations that interprets and enforces FD&C.
 Title 21 CFR Part 11 – defines the criteria under which electronic records and electronic signatures are considered to be trustworthy, reliable and equivalent to paper records.
 Health Insurance Portability and Accountability Act (HIPAA) – Title II of HIPAA addresses the security and privacy of health data, including data collected from subjects in clinical research.

Other 
 Declaration of Helsinki (United Nations)
 Food and Drugs Act (Canada)
 International Conference on Harmonisation of Technical Requirements for Registration of Pharmaceuticals for Human Use (European Union, Japan, and United States)

Government agencies
 Australian Drug Evaluation Committee
 European Medicines Agency
 Committee for Medicinal Products for Human Use
 Federal Agency for Medicines and Health Products (Belgium)
 Medicines and Healthcare products Regulatory Agency (United Kingdom)
 Ministry of Health, Labour and Welfare (Japan)
 Norwegian Medicines Agency
 State Food and Drug Administration (China)
 Swedish Medical Products Agency
 Therapeutic Products Directorate (Canada)
 Therapeutic Goods Administration (Australia)

United States Food and Drug Administration

Food and Drug Administration

Departments
 Commissioner of Food and Drugs – as head of the Food and Drug Administration, the commissioner reports to the Secretary of the Department of Health and Human Services
 Center for Biologics Evaluation and Research – responsible for review and approval of biologic products, including vaccines, blood products, gene therapy and human cloning
 Center for Devices and Radiological Health – responsible for review and approval of medical devices and safety of non-medical equipment that emit certain types of radiation
 Center for Drug Evaluation and Research – responsible for review and approval of all drugs
 Office of Regulatory Affairs – enforces FDA laws and regulations

Review and approval programs
 Investigational Device Exemption – allows an investigational device to be used in a clinical study in order to collect safety and effectiveness data
 Investigational New Drug – allows an investigational drug to be used in a clinical study in order to collect safety and effectiveness data
 New Drug Application – a submission to the FDA by a pharmaceutical company for review and approval of a new drug
 Abbreviated New Drug Application – a submission to the FDA review and approval of a generic drug
 FDA Fast Track Development Program – a designation given to an NDA by the FDA that accelerates review and approval of new drugs

See also 
 Glossary of clinical research
 List of biotechnology articles

 List of clinical research topics
Clinical research topics
Clinical
Clinical research
Clinical research